Devil's Due Productions is an American comic book company. This is a list of their publications.

Titles

A
 Aftermath: Blade of Kumori #1–5
 Aftermath: Breakdown #1–6
 Aftermath: Defex #1–6
 Aftermath: Infantry #1–6
 Army of Darkness: Ashes 2 Ashes #1–4
 Army of Darkness: Shop Till You Drop Dead #1–4

B
 Barack the Barbarian #1–4
 The Best of the Golden Age Sheena, Queen of the Jungle

C
 Cannon Busters #0–1
 Chucky #1–5 (by Brian Pulido and Josh Medors)
 The Corps! #0 (by Rick Remender and Roberto Carlos)
 Cosmic Guard #0–6

D
 Dawn of the Dread Force #0–4 (by Kurt Hathaway and Gerardo Sandoval, December 2008–April 2009)
 DemonWars: Demon Awakens #1–3
 DemonWars: The Demon Spirit #1–3
 Drafted #1–12 (by Mark Powers and Chris Lie)
 Drafted: One Hundred Days #1 (by Mark Powers, 2009)
 Dragonlance: The Legend of Huma #1–6
 Dragonlance: Legends Time of the Twins #1–3
 Dragonlance Chronicles, Vol. 1: Dragons of Autumn Twilight #1–8
 Dragonlance Chronicles, Vol. 2: Dragons of Winter Night #1–4
 Dragonlance Chronicles, Vol. 3: Dragons of Spring Dawning #1–12

E
 Eberron: Eye of the Wolf
 Echoes of the Damned #1 (by James Pascoe and Roger Robinson)

F
 Family Guy: Big Book o' Crap (collects Family Guy #1–3, April 2006)
 Family Guy, Vol. 1: 100 Ways to Kill Lois
 Family Guy, Vol. 2: Peter Griffin's Guide to Parenting
 Family Guy, Vol. 3: Books Don't Taste Very Good
 Forgotten Realms I: Homeland #0–3
 Forgotten Realms II: Exile #1–3
 Forgotten Realms III: Sojourn #1–3
 Forgotten Realms IV: The Crystal Shard #1–3
 Forgotten Realms V: Streams of Silver #1–3
 Forgotten Realms VI: The Halfling's Gem #1–3
 Forgotten Realms VII: Legacy #1–3
 Forgotten Realms VIII: Starless Night #1

G
 G.I. Joe: A Real American Hero #1–43
 G.I. Joe: America's Elite #0–36
 G.I. Joe: Battle Files #1–3
 G.I. Joe: Cobra Reborn #1
 G.I. Joe: Dreadnoks Declassified #1–3
 G.I. Joe: The Data Desk Handbook A–M
 G.I. Joe: The Data Desk Handbook N–Z
 G.I. Joe: Frontline #1–18
 G.I. Joe: Reborn #1
 G.I. Joe: Master and Apprentice #1–4
 G.I. Joe: Master and Apprentice II #1–4
 G.I. Joe: MIA #1–2
 G.I. Joe: Reloaded #1–14
 G.I. Joe: Scarlett Declassified #1
 G.I. Joe: Sigma 6 #1–6
 G.I. Joe: Snake Eyes Declassified #1–6
 G.I. Joe: Storm Shadow #1–7
 G.I. Joe Declassified #1–3
 G.I. Joe Special Missions: Antarctica
 G.I. Joe Special Missions: Brazil
 G.I. Joe Special Missions: The Enemy
 G.I. Joe Special Missions: Manhattan
 G.I. Joe Special Missions: Tokyo
 G.I. Joe vs. Transformers #1–6 (cross–production with Dreamwave Productions)
 G.I. Joe vs. Transformers 2 #1–4
 G.I. Joe vs. Transformers 3: The Art of War #1–4
 G.I. Joe vs. Transformers 4: Black Horizon #1–2

H
 Hack/Slash (April 2004)
 Hack/Slash: The Series #1–32 (May 2007—March 2010)
 Hack/Slash: Comic Book Carnage (March 2005)
 Hack/Slash: Entry Wound (May 2009)
 Hack/Slash: Girls Gone Dead (October 2004)
 Hack/Slash: Land of Lost Toys #1—3 (November 2005—January 2006)
 Hack/Slash: Slice Hard (December 2006)
 Hack/Slash: Trailers (March 2006)
 Hack/Slash/Evil Ernie (June 2005)
 Hack/Slash/Mercy Sparx: A Slice of Hell (October 2010, co-published with Arcana Studio)
 Hack/Slash vs. Chucky (March 2007, written by Tim Seeley and drawn by Matt Merhoff)
 Halloween: 30 Years of Terror (August 2008)
 Halloween: Nightdance #1—4 (February—May 2008)
 Halloween: The First Death of Laurie Strode #1—2 (September—November 2008)
 The Haunted Caves (October 2008)
 Hollow-Eyed Mary (April 2009)
 How to Be a Comic Book Artist...Not Just How to Draw (January 2007)
 How to Self–Publish Comics...Not Just Create Them #1—4 (February—June 2006)

I
 I Am Legion: The Dancing Faun #1–6 (released under Humanoids Publishing)

J
 Josh Howard's Black Harvest #1–6

K
 Killer7 #0–4
 Kore: Lost in Abaddon
 Kore and Warstone: The World of Abaddon

L
 Lost Squad #1–6
 Lovebunny & Mr. Hell
 Lovebunny & Mr. Hell: A Day in the Love Life
 Lovebunny & Mr. Hell: One Shot
 Lovebunny & Mr. Hell: Savage Love

M
 Mercy Sparx (2013 – )
 Micronauts #1–3 (2004)
 Micronauts: Karza #1–4
 Misplaced@17 #1
 Misplaced: Somewhere Under the Rainbow #1–4

N
 Nightwolf #0–5 (by Stephen L. Antczak and Nick Marinkovich) 
 Ninjatown: The Adventures of Wee Ninja #1
 The Nye Incidents #1 (by Whitley Strieber and Craig Spector)

P
 Proliferating ComiCulture: The Art, Rants, and Commentary of a Comic Book Upstart (June 2008)

S
 Sheena, Queen of the Jungle #0–5
 Sheena: Trail of the Mapinguari #1
 Spartacus: Blood and Sand #1–3
 Spooks #1–4
 Spooks: Omega Team #0

T
 The Toxic Avenger and Other Tromatic Tales #0

V
 Voltron: Defender of the Universe #1–11
 Voltron: A Legend Forged #1–5

W
 The Worlds of Dungeons and Dragons #1–7

X
 Xombie: Reanimated #1–6 (by James Farr and Nate Lovett)

Z
 Zombies That Ate the World #1–8 (by Guy Davis)

References

External links

Devil's Due Publishing at the Big Comic Book DataBase

 
Devil's Due